The Girl with Nine Wigs is a 2013 biographical comedy-drama film directed by Marc Rothemund, based on the autobiography Heute bin ich blond: Das Mädchen mit den neun Perücken by .

Cast
 Lisa Tomaschewsky as Sophie Ritter
  as Annabel
  as Rob
 Alice Dwyer as Saskia Ritter
  as Inge Ritter
  as Wolfgang Ritter
 Alexander Held as Dr. Friedrich Leonhard
 Jasmin Gerat as Chantal

References

External links
 

2013 films
2013 biographical drama films
2013 comedy-drama films
2010s German films
2010s German-language films
Belgian biographical drama films
Belgian comedy-drama films
Comedy-drama films based on actual events
Films about cancer
Films based on autobiographies
Films directed by Marc Rothemund
Films shot in Antwerp
Films shot in Hamburg
German biographical drama films
German comedy-drama films